K. Krishnankutty (born 13 August 1944) is an Indian politician and the current Minister for Electricity, Government of Kerala and MLA of Chittur constituency and the former Minister for Water Resources of Kerala state. He started his political career with the Congress party and became a KPCC member in 1969 and continued till the inception of Janata Party. He is a strong supporter of Cooperative Movement in Kerala. He has previously held the responsibility of being the President of Perumatty Service Co-operative Bank, the Director of Palghat District Co-operative Bank and Kerala State Co-operative Bank. He became a legislator in 6th, 7th, 9th and the 14th Kerala Legislative Assembly. He became a Minister in Pinarayi Vijayan's Ministry, after replacing Mathew T. Thomas, the legislator from Thiruvalla constituency.

He is the former Kerala State President of the Janata Dal (Secular).

He was born to Kunjukutty and Janaki of Ezhuthani in Perumatty on 13 August 1944. He completed 8th standard from Government S. M. High School, Tattamangalam.

References

Janata Dal (Secular) politicians
State cabinet ministers of Kerala
Janata Dal politicians
Janata Party politicians
1944 births

Living people